"Still Speedin'" is a single released by Ghanaian British musician Sway as the lead single from his third album The Deliverance, although it was not ultimately included on the album. The song features a sample of 'Ride on Time' by Black Box. The single was released on 4 December 2011. It peaked to number 19 on the UK Singles Chart. There are two alternate versions of the song featuring Kano or Lupe Fiasco.

Music video
A music video to accompany the release of "Still Speedin'" was first released onto YouTube on 24 October 2011 at a total length of three minutes and nineteen seconds.
Magician Dynamo makes a cameo appearance.

Track listing

Chart performance

Release history

References

2011 singles
2011 songs
Sway (musician) songs
Songs written by Sway (musician)
Songs written by Dan Hartman
Songs written by Giorgio Tuinfort